The Freebird I is an American single-seat, high wing, tricycle gear, single engined pusher configuration ultralight kit aircraft designed for construction by amateur builders by the Freebird Airplane Company of Marshville, North Carolina and later also produced by Pro Sport Aviation of Wingate, North Carolina.

The original Freebird I design was further refined and developed and was produced until late 2014 by Free Bird Innovations of Detroit Lakes, Minnesota as the LiteSport Ultra.

Development
The Freebird I was developed from the two-seater Freebird II that had been introduced at Sun 'n Fun 1996. The single seater was introduced in 1998 and retains the configuration and many features of the two seater, but with a revised, narrower fuselage. The aircraft was intended to meet the requirements of the US FAR 103 Ultralight Vehicles category, including that category's maximum  empty weight.

The Freebird I is constructed from bolted aluminum tubing, covered with doped aircraft fabric. The aircraft features conventional three-axis controls, including a trim system. The tricycle landing gear is steered by differential braking and a castering nosewheel. The company estimated that an average builder would take 120 hours to build the aircraft from the assembly kit.

The Freebird I's wings can be folded in five minutes by one person and the aircraft can then be trailered or stored. Options available included full cabin doors, flaperons, brakes, wheel pants and a custom-fitted trailer.

The original Freebird I has been replaced in the company line by the improved LiteSport Ultra. A new variant, the Freebird 103, using the same wing with a redesigned fuselage, was under development in 2009.

Variants
Freebird I
Sportlite 103
When it was in production it was available as a quick-build kit, fully assembled or as plans. The plans were extensive and included a 200 page construction manual, templates, covering instructions and a complete materials list. In 2001 the plans were US$185 and the manufacturer estimated that it would take 250 hours to build the aircraft from the plans. To help plans builders the manufacturer allowed builders to order any parts that they wanted without buying the complete kit.
LiteSport Ultra
Freebird 103
Model originally projected for introduction in 2011 as a single seat US FAR 103 ultralight aircraft with a design empty weight under . The 103 intended to use the LiteSport Ultra wing mated to a newly CAD designed fuselage frame to save weight and was to be built by Free Bird Innovations. The project was set back when the lead project engineer, Eric Grina, was killed in a car accident in October 2011.

Specifications (Freebird I)

See also

References

External links
 for the Ultra
 for the 103

Free Bird Innovations aircraft
1990s United States ultralight aircraft
Single-engined pusher aircraft